Hubert Prior Vallée (July 28, 1901 – July 3, 1986), known professionally as Rudy Vallée, was an American singer, musician, actor, and radio host. He was one of the first modern pop stars of the teen idol type.

Early life 
Hubert Prior Vallée was born in Island Pond, Vermont, United States, on July 28, 1901, the son of Catherine Lynch and Charles Alphonse Vallée. His maternal grandparents were English and Irish, while his paternal grandparents were French-Canadians from Quebec. Vallée grew up in Westbrook, Maine. On March 29, 1917, he enlisted to fight in World War I, but was discharged when U.S. Navy authorities discovered he was only 15 years old. He had enlisted in Portland, Maine, under the false birth date of July 28, 1899. He was discharged at the Naval Training Station in Newport, Rhode Island, on May 17, 1917, after 41 days of active service.

Career

Music 

After playing drums in his high school band, Vallée played clarinet and saxophone in bands around New England as a teenager. From 1924 to 1925, he played with the Savoy Havana Band at the Savoy Hotel in London, where band members discouraged his attempts to become a vocalist. He returned to the United States, briefly attending the University of Maine. He received a degree in philosophy from Yale University, where he played in the Yale Collegians with Peter Arno, who became a cartoonist for The New Yorker magazine.

After graduation, he formed Rudy Vallée and the Connecticut Yankees, having named himself after saxophonist Rudy Wiedoeft. With this band (formed in 1928), which included two violins, two saxophones, a piano, a banjo, and drums, he started singing. He had a thin, wavering tenor voice and seemed more at home singing sweet ballads than jazz songs. But his singing, suave manner, and boyish good looks attracted attention, especially from young women. Vallée was given a recording contract, and in 1928 he started performing on the radio, first at New York station WABC, leading his Yale Collegians Orchestra, and then on WEAF and the NBC Red Network beginning in February 1929.

He became one of the first crooners. Singers needed strong voices to fill theaters in the days before microphones. Crooners had soft voices that were suited to the intimacy of radio; the microphones, in this case, promoted direct access to "a vulnerable and sensuous interior," or in other words, "a conjured intimacy". Vallée's trombone-like vocal phrasing on "Deep Night" would inspire Bing Crosby, Frank Sinatra, and Perry Como to model their voices on jazz instruments.

Vallée was one of the first celebrity pop stars. Flappers pursued him wherever he went. His live appearances were usually sold out. Contrary to popular belief, he did not have screaming girls at his appearances. However, his voice still failed to project in venues without microphones and amplification, so he often sang through a megaphone. A caricature of him singing this way was depicted in the Betty Boop cartoon Poor Cinderella (1934). Another caricature is in Crosby, Columbo, and Vallee, which parodies him, Bing Crosby, and Russ Columbo.

In the words of a magazine writer in 1929,
At the microphone he is truly a romantic figure. Faultlessly attired in evening dress, he pours softly into the radio's delicate ear a stream of mellifluous melody. He appears to be coaxing, pleading and at the same time adoring the invisible one to whom his song is attuned.

Vallée had his share of detractors as well as fans when his popularity was at its height. Radio Revue, a radio fan magazine, held a contest in which people wrote letters explaining his success. The winning letter, written by a man who disliked Vallée's music, said, "Rudy Vallee is reaping the harvest of a seed that is seldom sown this day and age: LOVE. The good-looking little son-of-a-gun really and honestly LOVES his audience and his art. He LOVES to please listeners—LOVES it more than he does his name in the big lights, his mug in the papers. He loved all those unseen women as passionately as a voice can love, long before they began to purr and to caress him with two-cent stamps."

Vallée made his first records in 1928 for Columbia's low-priced labels Harmony, Velvet Tone, and Diva. He signed to RCA Victor in February 1929 and remained with the company through 1931, leaving after a heated dispute with executives over song selections. He then recorded for the short-lived Hit of the Week label which sold rather poor quality records laminated onto a cardboard base. In August 1932, he signed with Columbia and remained with the label through 1933. Vallée returned to RCA Victor in June 1933; his records were initially issued on Victor's low-priced Bluebird label until November 1933, when he was back on the standard Victor label. He remained with RCA Victor until signing with ARC in 1936. ARC issued his records on the Perfect, Melotone, Conqueror and Romeo labels until 1937, when he again returned to RCA Victor.

With his group the Connecticut Yankees, Vallée's best-known recordings include "The Stein Song" (a.k.a. University of Maine school song) in 1929  and "Vieni, Vieni" in the latter 1930s.

His last hit record was a reissue of "As Time Goes By", popularized in the 1942 film Casablanca. Due to the 1942-44 AFM recording ban, RCA Victor reissued the version he had recorded in 1931. During World War II, he enlisted in the United States Coast Guard to help direct the 11th district Coast Guard band as a Chief Petty Officer. He was promoted to Lieutenant and led the 40 piece band to great success. In 1944, he was placed on the inactive list and returned to radio.

According to George P. Oslin, Vallée on July 28, 1933, was the recipient of the first singing telegram. A fan telegraphed birthday greetings, and Oslin had the operator sing "Happy Birthday to You".

Radio and film 

In 1929, Vallée began hosting The Fleischmann's Yeast Hour, a popular radio show with guests such as Fay Wray and Richard Cromwell in dramatic skits. Vallée continued hosting radio shows such as the Royal Gelatin Hour, Vallee Varieties, and The Rudy Vallee Show through the 1930s and 1940s.

When Vallée took his contractual vacations from his national radio show in 1937, he insisted his sponsor hire Louis Armstrong as his substitute. This was the first instance of an African-American hosting a national radio program. Vallée wrote the introduction for Armstrong's 1936 book Swing That Music.

In 1929, Vallée made his first feature film, The Vagabond Lover, for RKO Radio. His first films were made to cash in on his singing popularity. While his initial performances were rather wooden, his acting greatly improved in the late 1930s and 1940s, and by the time he began working with Preston Sturges in the 1940s, he had become a successful comedic supporting player. He appeared opposite Claudette Colbert in Sturges's 1942 screwball comedy The Palm Beach Story. Other films in which he appeared include I Remember Mama, Unfaithfully Yours and The Bachelor and the Bobby-Soxer.

In 1955, Vallée was featured in Gentlemen Marry Brunettes, co-starring Jane Russell, Alan Young, and Jeanne Crain. The production was filmed on location in Paris. The film was based on the Anita Loos novel that was a sequel to her acclaimed Gentlemen Prefer Blondes. Gentlemen Marry Brunettes was popular throughout Europe at the time and was released in France as A Paris Pour les Quatre ("Paris for the Four"), and in Belgium as Tevieren Te Parijs.

Vallée performed on Broadway as J.B. Biggley in the 1961 musical How to Succeed in Business Without Really Trying and reprised the role in the 1967 film version. He appeared in the 1960s Batman television show as the villain Lord Marmaduke Ffogg and in 1971 as a vindictive surgeon in the Night Gallery episode "Marmalade Wine".

Vallee-Video
From 1948 to 1952, Vallée owned Vallee-Video, a television production company formed in the early days of national TV broadcasts. The company was incorporated on April 3, 1948. Vallée made 16mm film shorts for television, including These Foolish Things and Under a Campus Moon, in which he appeared himself. Ed Wynn, Pinky Lee, Buddy Lester and Cyril Smith also appeared in Vallee-Video productions. Comedy sequences in the productions featured dubbed-in laughter. 

In 1949, Vallee-Video produced one of the first cartoon shows on television, Tele-Comics.

Vallee-Video's breakthrough in 1952 would have been a 15-minute television show based on the Dick Tracy comic strip starring Vallée's friend Ralph Byrd, who played the character in four successful Dick Tracy theatrical serials from 1937 to 1941. Vallée sold the show as a pilot to NBC. Vallée and Byrd also worked on a proposed radio show based on the comic strip Hawkshaw the Detective. However, Byrd died in August 1952, bringing the Dick Tracy production to a halt, and spelling the end for Vallee-Video.

Personal life 
Vallée was married four times. He married Jane Greer on December 2, 1943, in Hollywood, but they separated after three months and divorced on July 27, 1944. His last wife, Eleanor, wrote a memoir called My Vagabond Lover. 

Always loyal to Yale University, Vallée never forgot his Maine roots, and maintained an estate at Kezar Lake.

NBC announcer George Ansbro wrote in his memoir that Vallée "had quite a temper and a very foul mouth... almost always the butt of his nastiness was the orchestra... his outbursts were mean-spirited, and he didn't care who overheard". Alton Cook, however, wrote, "Vallée may be fuming at his orchestra, but a Vallée hour rehearsal never quite loses its air of being a gathering of old friends... Rudy is grimly serious about rehearsal. He sometimes has his band spend a quarter-hour going over one short passage that doesn't satisfy him. On those occasions his temper wears thin..."

During his divorce from his second wife, Fay Webb, she alleged that "Vallée is possessed of a violent, vicious, and ungovernable temper, and given to the use of blasphemy and the use of intemperate, vile, and vituperative language, particularly when applied to [her]". She accused him of committing adultery with three women, including actress Alice Faye. Vallée denied the allegations, and the judge found him "not guilty of any misconduct or maltreatment of Webb which detrimentally affected her health, physical or medical condition".

Vallée got into a fist fight with producer George White on the set of the 1934 film George White's Scandals. Dorothy Brooks wrote in 1936, "Other stars on the air have their troubles, their disagreements, and yet you don't read about their ending in black eyes. Only Rudy Vallee seems to figure in endings of this kind." In an interview with Brooks, Vallée claimed he found fighting "savage and stupid" and "the wrong way to try to solve problems, because it never solves them". When asked why he got into fights, he replied, "I just lost my temper. I'll admit I have a too-quick temper."

Vallée died of cancer at his home (on "Rue de Vallee" in Los Angeles) on July 3, 1986, while watching the televised centennial ceremonies of the restored Statue of Liberty. His wife Eleanor said that his last words were, "I wish we could be there; you know how I love a party."

Legacy
In 1995, a Golden Palm Star on the Palm Springs, California, Walk of Stars was dedicated to him.

For his work in radio, Vallée was inducted into the Vermont Association of Broadcasters Hall of Fame in 2011.

Discography

Filmography

Gallery

Illustrations

Magazine covers

Videos

See also 
 Vallee Family House, a house listed on the National Register of Historic Places in Westbrook, Maine

References

Bibliography 

 Walker, Leo. (1976) "The Wonderful Era of the Great Dance Bands"

Further reading

External links

 Official site
 Rudy Vallee Collection  at the American Radio Archive the Thousand Oaks Library
 Virtual History
 A collection of rare aluminum transcription discs of some of Vallée's radio broadcasts is housed in the Great American Songbook Foundation archives
 Grave
 
 
 
 Rudy Vallée recordings at the Discography of American Historical Recordings.

Media

 The Royal Desserts Hour with Rudy Vallée (May 5, 1938) (one hour in)
 Recordings on Standard Labels at the Internet Archive
 Recordings on Discount Labels at the Internet Archive
 More recordings (including unreleased personal recordings) at the Internet Archive

1901 births
1986 deaths
20th-century American male actors
20th-century American singers
American bandleaders
American crooners
American male film actors
American male radio actors
American male pop singers
American people of French-Canadian descent
American people of Irish descent
Articles containing video clips
Deaths from cancer in California
Big band bandleaders
Singers from Vermont
People from Brighton, Vermont
People from Westbrook, Maine
Military personnel from Vermont
RCA Victor artists
Traditional pop music singers
United States Coast Guard Band musicians
Vaudeville performers
Yale University alumni
People from Lovell, Maine
Maine Republicans
20th-century American male singers
United States Navy personnel of World War I
Child soldiers in World War I
United States Coast Guard personnel of World War II
United States Coast Guard officers